Claire Vallance is a professor of Physical Chemistry at the University of Oxford, Tutorial Fellow in Physical Chemistry at Hertford College, and past President of the Faraday Division of the Royal Society of Chemistry. In collaboration with professor Mark Brouard and others, she created the PImMS (Pixel Imaging Mass Spectrometry) sensor, used for time-of-flight particle imaging and recently featured in the Royal Society of Chemistry's Research Frontiers report. She is co-founder of the spin-out company Oxford HighQ, which is developing next-generation chemical and nanoparticle sensors based on optical microcavity technology. Vallance's research spans chemical reaction dynamics, optical microcavity spectroscopy, and applications of spectroscopy and imaging in medical diagnostics. She is also an accomplished musician and triathlete.

Education 
Claire Vallance attended Marlborough Girls' College in Blenheim, New Zealand.  She then studied Chemistry, Physics, Mathematics, and Music at the University of Canterbury, where she completed a B.Sc.(hons) degree in 1995, graduating first in her year. She studied for a Ph.D. under the supervision of Peter Harland, working in gas-phase molecular dynamics, and graduated in early 1999. Upon completion of her studies, she returned to Oxford to take up a Violette and Samuel Glasstone Fellowship in the Physical and Theoretical Chemistry Laboratory and a Junior Research Fellowship at St. Catherine's College.

Honours and awards
Fellow of the Royal Society of Chemistry, 2016

Books
 Tutorials in Molecular Reaction Dynamics. RSC Press, 2010. (Joint editor with Mark Brouard)
 Astrochemistry: from the Big Bang to the Present Day, World Scientific Press, 2017.
An Introduction to Chemical Kinetics, Morgan-Claypool Publishing, 2017
An Introduction to the Gas Phase, Morgan-Claypool Publishing, 2018

References

External links

Living people
Year of birth missing (living people)
Fellows of Hertford College, Oxford
Physical chemists
New Zealand women chemists
New Zealand pianists
New Zealand women pianists
New Zealand chemists
New Zealand violinists
21st-century pianists
21st-century violinists
21st-century women pianists